Putumanna Kandaru Menon (1750–1766) was a Chaver who died during the 1766 Mamankam. At the time of his death, he was 16 years old. During the Mamankam, Menon fought through the warriors of Zamorin and reached the "Nilapatuthara" (stage) and swung his sword at the Zamorin. Kander Menon's songs describe the heroic history of Kandar Menon of Vatonneveet and his son Ithappu, who went to Tirunnavaya and fought against the soldiers of the Samothiri at Mamangam in the year 1683 of year.  Kandar Menon and Ithappu who reached the stage on the day of Mamanka and reached the stage by bravely fighting many of the Zamorin army and reached the stage.  Unniraman, a soldier of the Samuthir in Madappuram, who saw him approaching the Samuthir, killed Ithapu with a sword.Immediately Kander Menon jumped into the crowd and Nambioli, who was standing in front of Cherai Panicker (Chettuvayi), cut down the doctors and collided with Cherai Panicker, a scholar. Cherai Panicker, who has been pitied many times, had a tough fight with Menon.  Before Kander Menon, all the efforts of the builders failed and his hand began to grow weak and limp.  That's when Panicker made a fake.  It slashed at Menon's thigh, causing Kander Menon to fall to his knees on the floor.  Menon, who was about to fall and die, looked at Panicker's Nabi and kicked him before dying.

See also
Nair
Putumanna Panikkar
Zamorin

References

People from Malappuram district
Military personnel from Kerala
1766 deaths
1750 births